María Inés Calderón (1605, in Madrid – 1678, in Guadalajara) also known as La Calderona and Marizápalos, was a Spanish actress, the mistress of Philip IV and the mother of his only recognized natural son, John of Austria the Younger.

Biography 
María Calderón attracted the attention of the monarch upon her debut at the theatre de Corral de la Cruz in Madrid in 1627. She was at the time involved in a relationship with Ramiro Pérez de Guzmán, Duke of Medina de las Torres, widower of the daughter of Gaspar de Guzmán y Pimentel. The King forced her to quit her career and installed her in a palace in Madrid. Upon the birth of her son in 1629, she lost the custody of him despite her protests. Her relationship to the king ended the same year. There were rumors at the time that her son was fathered by Ramiro Pérez de Guzmán.

In March 1642, María Calderón was forced to become a nun against her will. She retired to the monastery of San Juan Bautista of Valfermoso of the Nuns, in the Province of Guadalajara in the  Utande Valley. She became abbess in 1643.

Legacy
The Sierra Calderona range at the Eastern end of the Iberian System was formerly known as Monts de Porta Coeli, after the Carthusian Monastery of Porta Coeli located in the mountains. The present-day name Calderona originated in the 17th century when María Calderón "La Calderona", hid from King Felipe IV in these mountains among the highwaymen.

In music
The romanca "Marizapalos" by Gaspar Sanz, who taught the king's only recognized natural born son by Maria, tells the risque story of the niece of a priest who neglecting her studies picks flowers and accepts the love of a young man.

References

1611 births
1646 deaths
17th-century Spanish actresses
17th-century Spanish people
Mistresses of Spanish royalty
Spanish actresses